Tony Nader (Born: Tanios Abou Nader; Arabic: طوني أبو ناضر) is a Lebanese neuroscientist, researcher, university president, author and leader of the Transcendental Meditation movement. He has a medical degree in internal medicine, received his Ph.D. from Massachusetts Institute of Technology and worked as a clinical and research fellow at a teaching hospital of Harvard Medical School.

Nader worked with Deepak Chopra at the Maharishi Ayurveda Health Center in Massachusetts and in 1994, published his first book, Human Physiology: Expression of Veda and the Vedic literature. He is president of both Maharishi University of Management (Holland) and Maharishi Open University.

In 2000, Nader received the title of First Sovereign Ruler of the conceptual country, Global Country of World Peace from Transcendental Meditation founder Maharishi Mahesh Yogi, and in 2008, was named the Maharishi's successor. Nader published his second book, Ramayan In Human Physiology in 2011. In 2015 Nader founded the International Journal of Mathematics and Consciousness and is serving as the editor-in-chief.

Education
Nader attended the American University of Beirut, where he studied internal medicine and psychiatry and received his master's degree and a medical degree in internal medicine and psychiatry. He earned his Ph.D. from the Massachusetts Institute of Technology (MIT) in the field of Brain and Cognitive Science and became a visiting physician at their Clinical Research Center. His post-doctoral work was as a clinical and research fellow at the Massachusetts General Hospital, a teaching hospital of Harvard Medical School.

Career
Nader has conducted research in hormonal activity, neurochemistry, neuroendocrinology, on the medical role of the neurotransmitter and on the relationship between age, behavior, diet, seasonal influences and mood. Nader reports that his desire to have a complete understanding of the mind and body and its relationship to consciousness and the human physiology led him to a "spiritual awakening" and the study of Vedic science with the Maharishi. Nader said he learned about "the field of spiritual or non-physical, or non-material and how it expresses itself in the universe" from the Maharishi. As a professor and director, Nader has conducted Maharishi Vedic Approach to Health programs and lectured in "more than 50 countries".

In 1986, Nader was criticized for overstating his post-graduate connections to MIT and implying that his research was sanctioned by his alma mater. In 1987, Nader worked at the Maharishi Ayurveda Health Center in Lancaster, Massachusetts.

In his 1994 book Human Physiology: Expression of Veda and the Vedic Literature, Nader postulated a one-to-one correlation of structure and function between 40 aspects of Vedic literature and 40 parts of human physiology. He also said he discovered similarities between the astrological influence of the planets and parts of the human brain. This body of work is reported to have been "derived from" the Maharishi's ideas and Nader's own training in brain physiology. In May 1995, Nader was a keynote speaker at Maharishi University of Management and presented his "recent discovery of how Natural Law manages the physiology and the application of this knowledge to prevent and eliminate problems." The book has been described as an attempt at documenting the scientific basis of the Maharishi's "interpretation of Advaita Vedanta and thus the Vedas … by relating neuroanatomy and neurophysiology to Vedic astrology and philosophy".

Nader performed the first research on Maharishi Vedic Vibration Technology (MVVT), which aims "to enliven the inner intelligence of the body and restore proper functioning" through the use of Vedic sounds. Nader's studies were conducted in Berlin, Paris, and Valkenburg, testing the effectiveness of one session of MVVT in people with disorders that included arthritis, asthma, and gastrointestinal disorders.

During a four-day Vedic ceremony in October 2000, Nader was honored by Maharishi as Maharaja (great king) Adhiraj Rajaraam and given responsibility for the Global Country of World Peace and, in 2008, became the Maharishi's successor. During these transitions, Nader was reportedly given various titles including "Vishwa Prashasak Raja Raam", "Adhi Raam", and "Raja Nader Raam". In 2002, Nader was invited by the mayor of Maharishi Vedic City to take residence at The Mansion Hotel, which serves as the capital of the conceptual Global Country of World Peace. In 2008, a spokesman said Nader would reign in silence and communicate through his governing council.

Nader published his second book, called Ramayan In Human Physiology in 2011, documenting the correlation between the characters, relationships, locations, and events of the Valmiki Ramayana with the structures and functions of human physiology. Nader says that his study does not conclude that the Ramayana belongs to any one religion or race or belief system. Rather, the Ramayana is the story of Natural Law and how it unfolds in every individual and the universe. In 2012, Nader was the keynote speaker on a tour of 10 cities in North American, entitled "A New Paradigm: Veda, Consciousness, the Ramayana, and the Self". His presentation in Chicago to 650 Indian Americans received a standing ovation. During the tour, Nader gave presentations on “Embodying Totality” and “Introductory Seminar on the Ramayan in Human Physiology".

Nader in his book, Human Physiology-expression of Veda and the Vedic Literature, postulated that the physical and material are aspects of Consciousness rather than Consciousness being an epiphenomenon of physical matter or a product of the brain and the nervous system. During his 2014 course, Hacking Consciousness, at Stanford University, he presented its mathematical framework. Subsequently, he describes with further mathematical detail his postulate that multiplicity including all matter arises from a primordial singularity of Consciousness through the spontaneous phenomenon of Consciousness actually exercising its basic nature of being conscious and thus knowing itself.

In his latest book One Unbounded Ocean of Consciousness Nader describes step by step how consciousness as a primary singularity and the underlying reality in all that there is, can manifest as multiplicity, expand, and evolve into the physical and material universe with all its diverse aspects. The paradigm he presents offers solutions to several philosophical and scientific problems and a unifying platform for many theories and belief systems. It addresses questions about freedom versus determinism, the source of evil, trial and error in evolution versus design, law, order, responsibility and justice. In this book he also discusses and defines fundamental ontological and epistemological questions about existence, reality, illusion, the nature of being, and the possible range of knowledge in the context of consciousness and how individual consciousness can be expanded to higher states beyond sleep, dream, and waking.

Publications
 Nader, Tony (1994) and (2000)  Maharishi Vedic University, Human Physiology: Expression of Veda and the Vedic Literature
 Nader, Tony (1995) Maharishi Vedic University Press, La découverte du Veda et de la littérature védique dans la physiologie humaine: la science moderne et la science védique ancienne découvrent les fondements de l'immortalité
 Nader, Tony (2011) Maharishi Press Ltd, Ramayana in Human Physiology
 Nader, Tony (2012) Maharishi University of Management Press, Consciousness Is Primary, Illuminating the Leading Edge of Knowledge
Nader, Tony (2021) Penguin Random House Grupo Editorial, SA. Digital edition One Unbounded Ocean of Consciousness

References

External links
 Official YouTube channel
 Summary of Nader's research on Veda in Human Physiology
 Photograph of Nader being awarded his weight in gold

Transcendental Meditation exponents
Transcendental Meditation researchers
Lebanese neurologists
American University of Beirut alumni
Massachusetts Institute of Technology alumni
Living people
Micronational leaders
Year of birth missing (living people)